The 1982 Italian Open was a tennis tournament that was played by men on outdoor clay courts at the Foro Italico in Rome, Italy and was part of the 1982 Volvo Grand Prix. The women's tournament was played on outdoor clay courts in Perugia, Italy and was part of the Toyota Series of the 1982 WTA Tour. The men's tournament was held from May 17 through May 21, 1982, while the women's tournament was played from 3 May through 9 May 1982.

Finals

Men's singles
 Andrés Gómez defeated  Eliot Teltscher 6–2, 6–3, 6–2

Women's singles
 Chris Evert Lloyd defeated  Hana Mandlíková 6–0, 6–2

Men's doubles
 Heinz Günthardt /  Balázs Taróczy defeated  Wojtek Fibak /  John Fitzgerald 6–4, 4–6, 6–3

Women's doubles
 Kathleen Horvath /  Yvonne Vermaak defeated  Billie Jean King /  Ilana Kloss 2–6, 6–4, 7–6

References

External links
 WTA Archive 1982: Virginia Slims Tour: accessed 17/05/2011.
 Women's Draw Singles: accessed 17/05/2011.
 Women's Draw Doubles: accessed 17/05/2011

Italian Open
Italian Open
Italian Open (tennis)
1982 in Italian tennis